Wink or Winks is an English surname. Notable people with the surname include:

 Chris Wink, co-founder of Blue Man Group
 Harry Winks (born 1996), English footballer
 Jack Wink, American college football player and coach
 Josh Wink (born Joshua Winkelman, 1970), American DJ and musician
 Katharine Winks (born 1978), English cricketer
 Robin Winks (1930–2003), American academic, historian, diplomat and writer
 Walter Wink (1935-2012), American theologian and political theorist